Hypoplectis is a monotypic moth genus in the family Geometridae. Its only species, Hypoplectis pertextaria, is found in Suriname. Both the genus and species were first described by Jacob Hübner in 1823.

References

Baptini
Monotypic moth genera